Sgurr Innse (809 m) is a mountain in the Grampian Mountains of Scotland, situated south of the village of Roybridge in Lochaber.

A rocky lump of a mountain, it offers fantastic views from its summit.

References

Mountains and hills of Highland (council area)
Marilyns of Scotland
Corbetts